Terrence Vincent Upchurch II (born October 17, 1988) is an American politician serving as a member of the Ohio House of Representatives from the 20th district.

Early life and education 
Upchurch was born in Cleveland and raised in the Collinwood and Glenville neighborhoods. He earned a Bachelor of Arts degree in political science from Cleveland State University. He is pursuing a Master of Public Administration from Villanova University.

Career 
Prior to his election, Upchurch served as a special assistant on the Cleveland City Council. In 2020, Upchurch became an Honorary Co-Chair of Students for Gun Legislation, a 501(c)4 Non-Profit.

After winning the 2018 Democratic primary election on August 7 over seven other candidates, including former Cleveland City Councilmember T.J. Dow, Upchurch was elected unopposed in the general election on November 6, 2018.

Upchurch serves on the Economic and Workforce Development, Health, and Insurance committees.

References

Upchurch, Terrence
Living people
21st-century American politicians
1988 births
Cleveland State University alumni